Israel Michael Lerner (May 14, 1910 – June 12, 1977) was a prominent geneticist and evolutionary biologist. Born in Harbin, Manchuria, he received his Ph.D. in genetics at the University of California, Berkeley in 1936. He was appointed instructor of poultry husbandry and joined the university's department of genetics in 1958.

Much of his research involved the inheritance of components underlying egg production, the effects of artificial selection with inbreeding, and theoretical models predicting the effects of simultaneous selection upon numerous inherited characteristics. A number of his books include Population Genetics and Animal Improvement (1950), Genetic Homeostasis (1954), The Genetic Basis of Selection (1958), and Heredity, Evolution and Society (1968). He also served as editor for the journal Evolution, and was an elected member of the National Academy of Sciences, the American Philosophical Society, and the American Academy of Arts and Sciences.

References

External links
 I. Michael Lerner Papers at the American Philosophical Society
 I. Michael Lerner by R. W. Allard
National Academy of Sciences Biographical Memoir

1910 births
1977 deaths
Developmental biologists
Evolutionary biologists
Members of the United States National Academy of Sciences
Chinese emigrants to the United States
Fellows of the American Academy of Arts and Sciences
Members of the American Philosophical Society